The 1782 English cricket season was the 11th in which matches have been awarded retrospective first-class cricket status. The scorecards of four first-class matches have survived. The great fast bowler David Harris made his first-class debut and the Hambledon Club moved to Windmill Down as a new home venue.

Matches 
Four first-class match scorecards survive from 1782, three of them matches between Kent XIs and Hampshire XIs. The other match was between a Hampshire XI and an England side.

Other events
The Hampshire Chronicle reported in June the first meeting on Windmill Down, referring to the ground as "a field called the New Broad Halfpenny adjoining to the Town of Hambledon".

First mentions
 David Harris
 Joey Ring

References

Further reading
 
 
 
 
 

1782 in English cricket
English cricket seasons in the 18th century